Norman Roy Richards (6 April 1890 – 26 July 1952) was an Australian rules footballer who played with University in the Victorian Football League (VFL).

Notes

References
Holmesby, Russell & Main, Jim (2007). The Encyclopedia of AFL Footballers. 7th ed. Melbourne: Bas Publishing.

External links

1890 births
University Football Club players
Australian rules footballers from Victoria (Australia)
1952 deaths
People from Mooroopna